"Auf zu neuen Horizonten" (On to new horizons) is a Christian hymn with text by Helmut Schlegel, and music by Stephan Sahm. It is of the genre Neues Geistliches Lied. The song is included in the Catholic hymnal for young people, Ein Segen sein, and other songbooks.

History 
The text of "Auf zu neuen Horizonten" was written by the Franciscan Helmut Schlegel for the opening of a mass of an international youth pilgrimage to Vézelay in Burgundy. It is in five stanzas with a refrain.

The hymn appears in the Catholic hymnal for young people, Ein Segen sein (Be a blessing), and in the songbook for choir and band, Die Träume hüten (Guarding the dreams), published by the Dehm-Verlag.

References 

German poems
Catholic hymns in German
Contemporary Christian songs

Neues Geistliches Lied
21st-century hymns in German